Pectocaris is a genus of extinct bivalved arthropod from the Cambrian Maotianshan Shale, Yunnan Province of China. There are currently three known species within the genus.

Discovery 
The first species in the genus, Pectocaris spatiosa, was described in 1999 from fossils from Maotianshan Shale, however they were not the first fossils of the genus to be dug out of the formation, in 1987 partial hymenocarine fossils were described as belonging to the genus Odaraia (Odaraia ? eurypetala). Since these fossils were partially preserved, they were not recognised as part of a different genus until 2004, keeping their species name, erecting Pectocaris euryptela. The final species, Pectocaris inopinata was not described until 2021. All species come from the Yu'anshan Member of the Chiungchussu Formation.

The genus' name, Pectocaris, comes from Latin Pecto, "comb"; and caris, "shrimp" or "crab".

Description and Species 
Pectocaris possessed a fused bivalved carapace, covering about half of the total body length; out of which a couple of pedunculate eyes, both antennae and part of the head. They had triangular-shaped mandibles. They had a multisegmented body, with pairs of limbs across it; only the cephalothorax had biramic appendages, the rest of them possessing a multisegmented endopod and a flap-shaped exopod, bordered by marginal setae, much like their antennae. Their body ended in a long telson, with a pair of fins forming a crescent moon shape.

Pectocaris spatiosa 

The type and largest species, surpassing  in length. They possessed about 50 body segments, each one accompanied by its own pair of limbs. The cephalothoracic appendages were relatively thin and their antennae were the shortest proportionally.

The species' name comes from Latin, meaning "spacious".

Pectocaris eurypetala 

They possessed about 53 body segments, each one accompanied by its own pair of limbs. The cephalothoracic appendages were relatively thin, with endites, their antennae were the thinnest proportionally.

The species' name comes from Latin eury, "wide", and Greek petala, "petals"; meaning "wide petals", referring to their bivalved carapace.

Pectocaris inopinata 
The smallest species in the genus, barely reaching . They possessed about 41-46 body segments, only 29 of them possessed limbs.  The cephalothoracic appendages were relatively strong, with endites and a claw; their antennae were the most robust, proportionally.

The species' name comes from Latin inopinans, "unexpected", since the authors were not expecting to find fossils from this rare genus, and because, since they lacked microscopes in the field, they were unable to identify them as a new species,

Ecology 
Species of Pectocaris are thought to have been active swimmers. P. spatiosa and P. eurypetala have been suggested to be filter feeders, using the setae on the endites of their limbs to filter out matter from the water column, while P. inopinata has been suggested to be a predator, using its spinose antennae to capture prey.

Taxonomy 
Pectocaris has been generally recovered as closely related to other bivalved arthropods such as Odaraia and Jugatacaris, with some studies including it within the clade Hymenocarina.

See also

 Arthropod
 Cambrian explosion
 Chengjiang biota
 List of Chengjiang Biota species by phylum

References

Cambrian arthropods
Maotianshan shales fossils
Hymenocarina